The men's giant slalom at the 2007 Asian Winter Games was held on 1 February 2007 at Beida Lake Skiing Resort, China.

Schedule
All times are China Standard Time (UTC+08:00)

Results
Legend
DNF — Did not finish
DNS — Did not start

References

Results

External links
Official website

Men giant slalom